Romance is a 1986 Italian drama film directed by Massimo Mazzucco. It was entered into the main competition at the 43rd Venice International Film Festival, in which Walter Chiari won the Pasinetti Award for best actor. For his performance Chiari also won the Ciak d'oro for best actor.

Plot summary

Cast 
 Walter Chiari as Giulio 
 Luca Barbareschi as Andrea
 Patrizia Fachini as Andrea's Wife
 Giancarlo Garbelli as The Coach 
 Regina Nitsch as The Lover

References

External links
 
 
 

1986 films
Italian romantic drama films
1986 romantic drama films
1980s Italian-language films
1980s Italian films